Gerry Francis (born 6 December 1933) is a former professional footballer who played as a right winger for Leeds United, York City and Tonbridge Angels. He was the first black footballer to play for Leeds.

Playing career
Francis, who was a shoe-repairer from South Africa, began his footballing career in England as an amateur with Leeds United before being given a professional contract in July 1957. He made his debut in the 1959–60 season, becoming the first black footballer to play for Leeds. He joined a declining side that was relegated at the end of the 1959–60 season and despite a spectacular goal against Everton in October 1959 and a memorable performance in a 3–2 victory at Lincoln City in December 1960, he struggled to make an impression and was released in October 1961 to join York City where he scored four goals in 16 appearances in the 1961–62 season.

Personal life
In 1962, Francis married a Trinidadian-born bookkeeper. Together they had two children, born in 1968 and 1973. In 1971, Francis and his children migrated to Toronto, Canada. He currently resides with his wife of 57 years, children and two grandchildren.

Playing statistics

References

Leeds United F.C. players
York City F.C. players
1933 births
Living people
English footballers
Association football wingers